Alexander IV (Alek'sandre IV) (died 1695), of the Bagrationi Dynasty, was a king of Imereti (western Georgia) from 1683 to 1690 and again from 1691 to 1695.

Reign 
A natural son of Bagrat V of Imereti, he was a political hostage at the eastern Georgian court of George XI of Kartli at the death of his father in 1681. Giorgi III Gurieli, Prince of Guria, capitalized on the vacuum of power in Imereti, and seized the crown the same year. However, George XI and the Imeretian nobles secured the Ottoman recognition for Alexander, who was enthroned in Imereti after deposing Prince Gurieli in 1683.

Alexander married off his sister Darejan to his powerful vassal Paata Abashidze, lord of Upper Imereti, and succeeding in crushing the aristocratic opposition led by Prince Gurieli in 1684. In order to get rid of the Ottoman hegemony, Alexander transferred his loyalty to the Safavid shah Suleiman I of Persia in 1689, but was expelled by the Turks into Kartli in August 1690.

In 1691, through the mediation of Erekle I of Kartli and the Persian government, Alexander was restored in Imereti after a year of anarchy and misrule, only to be dethroned by the nobles led by his own father-in-law Prince Giorgi-Malakia Abashidze. The leaders of the coup delivered Alexander to the anti-Persian king of Kartli, George XI, who had him executed and buried at the Ruisi church in 1695.

Family
Alexander married, in 1691, Tamar (1681–1716), daughter of Prince Giorgi-Malakia Abashidze. Prior to that, he lived in an unofficial union with a certain noblewoman (Nino Gurieli, according to Cyril Toumanoff), who bore him two sons, Simon and George. Alexander also had two daughters, probably born by Abashidze:
 Simon (died 1701) was King of Imereti from 1699 to 1701.
 George VII (died 1720) was King of Imereti, with intermissions, from 1707 to 1720.
 A daughter (died 1720), who was married to Prince Bezhan Tsereteli (died 1680).
 A daughter (fl. 1709), who was married to Shoshita III, Duke of Racha (died 1729).

References 

 Вахушти Багратиони (Vakhushti Bagrationi) (1745). История Царства Грузинского: Жизнь Имерети.
David Marshall Lang, The Last Years of the Georgian Monarchy, 1658–1832. New York: Columbia University Press, 1957.

17th-century births
1695 deaths
Bagrationi dynasty of the Kingdom of Imereti
Kings of Imereti
Eastern Orthodox monarchs
Illegitimate children of Georgian monarchs